The Wadagawa Dam is a gravity dam on the Wadagawa River (a tributary of the Shō River) in Tonami, Toyama Prefecture, Japan. It was constructed between 1962 and 1967. The dam has an associated 7.4 MW hydroelectric power station which was commissioned in 1968. Of the dams in the Shō River system, it is the furthest downstream.

See also

Shogawa Goguchi Dam – first, and furthest downstream, of nine dams on the Shō River main stem

References

Dams in Toyama Prefecture
Gravity dams
Dams completed in 1967
Dams on the Shō River
Hydroelectric power stations in Japan